Flirting with the Universe is the fourth studio album by The Rainmakers, released in 1994. The album achieved the equivalent of gold record status in Norway in one month.

Track listing
All tracks written by Bob Walkenhorst except where noted.

 "Another Guitar" – 4:25
 "Width of a Line" – 3:52
 "Fool's Gold" – 4:41
 "Window" (Steve Phillips) – 4:00
 "View from the Tower" – 4:27
 "Greatest Night of My Life" – 4:43
 "Wilder Side" (Steve Phillips) – 3:20
 "You Remind Me of Someone" – 2:52
 "Little Tiny World" – 4:07
 "Mystery Road" – 5:21
 "Spite" – 5:05

Personnel
Bob Walkenhorst – lead vocals, guitar, keyboards, harmonica
Rich Ruth – bass guitar
Steve Phillips – guitar, vocals, keyboards, dulcimer
Pat Tomek – drums, vocals

References 

1994 albums
Mercury Records albums
The Rainmakers (band) albums